Julie Sergie Sommars (born April 15, 1940) is an American actress. She won a Golden Globe Award for Best Actress – Television Series Musical or Comedy for her role in The Governor & J.J. in 1970, and was nominated for a Golden Globe Award for Best Supporting Actress on Television for Matlock in 1990.

Life and career
Sommars was born in Fremont, Nebraska on April 15, 1940. She was raised in Iowa and South Dakota.

Television
Sommars is best known for her work on television. She made her television debut In 1960, at the age of eighteen, in an episode of The Loretta Young Show. She later appeared in Gunsmoke, Shirley Temple's Storybook, The Great Adventure, Bonanza, Run, Buddy, Run, Perry Mason, Ben Casey, Death Valley Days, The Fugitive, The Man from U.N.C.L.E., Get Smart, and Love, American Style.

From 1969 to 1970, Sommars starred as Jennifer Jo "J.J." Drinkwater, the daughter of Dan Dailey's the "Governor" in the CBS comedy series, The Governor & J.J.. In 1970, she won the Golden Globe Award for Best Actress – Television Series Musical or Comedy for her performance on the show. The series was canceled after two seasons.

After The Governor & J.J., Sommars played the leading roles in a number of made for television movies and starred in several pilots. She guest starred on The Rockford Files, Harry O, McCloud, McMillan, Barnaby Jones, Fantasy Island, Magnum, P.I., and Diagnosis: Murder. In 1984, she was a regular cast member in the short-lived syndicated soap opera, Rituals. From 1987 to 1994, Sommars played assistant District Attorney Julie March on the NBC legal series, Matlock. This role also garnered her a nomination for a Golden Globe Award for Best Supporting Actress on Television in 1990.

Film
Sommars has appeared in four films. She played the female lead in the 1965 western The Great Sioux Massacre with Joseph Cotten. The following year, she starred with Brian Bedford in the comedy The Pad and How to Use It. In 1977, Sommars co-starred with Dean Jones and Don Knotts as the beautiful, assertive Diane Darcy in Herbie Goes to Monte Carlo.

Filmography

Letter to Loretta as Laury Barlow (1 episode, 1960)
Sea Hunt as Betty Crane (Season 3, Episode 31, 1960)
Shirley Temple's Storybook as Princess Mary (1 episode, 1960)
Holiday Lodge as Cecilia (1 episode, 1961)
The Tall Man as Anna Henry (1 episode, 1961)
Outlaws as Ellie (1 episode, 1961)
The Great Adventure as Meg Jethro (1 episode, 1964)
Memo from Purgatory (1964)
Bonanza - Episode - The Roper - Emma Hewitt (1964)
Sex and the College Girl (1964) as Susan
Slattery's People as Electra Walton (1 episode, 1965)
Flipper as Tina's Mother (1 episode, 1965)
Perry Mason as Helen Kendall (1 episode, 1965)
Mr. Novak as Ellen Cable (1 episode, 1965)
Ben Casey as Ruth Ann Carmody (1 episode, 1965)
The Great Sioux Massacre (1965) as Caroline Reno
Death Valley Days as Tulie in "Peter the Hunter", and as Sister Blandina Segale in "The Fastest Nun in the West" (2 episodes, 1964, 1966)
Gunsmoke as Bess Campbell (4 episodes, 1964-1966)
Gunsmoke as Elsie Howell (1 episode, 1965)
Gunsmoke as Sara Stone (1 episode, 1966)
Gunsmoke as Gert
The Pad and How to Use It (1966) as Doreen Marshall
Run Buddy Run as Betsy Jensen (1 episode, 1966)
Bob Hope Presents the Chrysler Theatre as Maggie Lake (1 episode, 1966)
The Fugitive as Carla Karac (2 episodes, 1965-1966)
My Husband Tom...and John unaired pilot film (1966)
The Man from U.N.C.L.E. as Darlene Sims (2 episodes, 1965-1967)
The Invaders as Grace Vincent (1 episode, 1967)
He & She as Rosemary Wallace (1 episode, 1967)
Dundee and the Culhane as Lela (1 episode, 1967)
Get Smart as Mimsi Sage (1 episode, 1968)
European Eye (1968) as Molly
Felony Squad as Ellen Willis (2 episodes, 1968)
Judd for the Defense as Trish Overbaugh (1 episode, 1968)
The Name of the Game as Barbara Ellis (1 episode, 1968)
The Virginian as Martha Carson (1 episode, 1968)
The F.B.I. as Betty Caldwell (3 episodes, 1967-1969)
Lancer as Catha Cameron (1 episode, 1969)
The Governor & J.J. as Jennifer Jo Drinkwater (39 episodes, 1969-1970)
Five Desperate Women (1971) as Mary Grace Brown
The Harness (1971) as Jennifer Shagaras
How to Steal an Airplane (1971) as Dorothy
McCloud as Jennie (1 episode, 1971)
Owen Marshall: Counselor at Law as Jill Peniman (1 episode, 1972)
Rex Harrison Presents Stories of Love (1974) as Patricia
Thriller as Ann Rogers (1 episode, 1974)
Fools, Females and Fun (1974) as Alice Shoemaker
Harry O as Gertrude Blainey (1 episode, 1974)
The Rockford Files as Tawnia Baker (1 episode, 1974)
McCloud as Police Sgt. Mildred Cross (1 episode, 1974)
Barnaby Jones as Ruby Deems (1 episode, 1974)
Switch as Lane Cameron (1 episode, 1975)
The Family Holvak as Kate Gifford (1 episode, 1975)
Three for the Road as Amy Parsons (1 episode, 1975)
Ellery Queen as Emmy Reinhart (1 episode, 1975)
Bronk as Sara (1 episode, 1976)
Jigsaw John as Carol Chapman (1 episode, 1976)
McMillan and Wife as Carol Hanover (1 episode, 1977)
Herbie Goes to Monte Carlo (1977) as Diane Darcy
Fantasy Island as Carmen Drake (1 episode, 1978)
Centennial as Alice Grebe (1 episode, 1979)
Sex and the Single Parent (1979) as Bonnie
Barnaby Jones as Amy Cameron (1 episode, 1979)
Beyond Westworld as Liz Nicholson (1 episode, 1980)
Fantasy Island as Laura Crane (1 episode, 1980)
Magnum, P.I. as Jennie 'JL' Lowry/Texas Lightning (1 episode, 1982)
Cave-In! (1983) as Liz Johnson
Emergency Room (1983) as Nina Cole
Partners in Crime as Nola (1 episode, 1984)
Perry Mason: The Case of the Glass Coffin (1991) as Betty Farmer
Matlock as A.D.A. Julie March (94 episodes, 1987-1992)
Diagnosis Murder as Regina Baylor (1 episode, 1994)
Matlock as Julie March (1 episode, 1994)

References

External links
 
 

1940 births
Living people
American film actresses
American television actresses
Best Musical or Comedy Actress Golden Globe (television) winners
Actresses from Iowa
Actresses from South Dakota
20th-century American actresses
21st-century American women